Not So Quiet: Stepdaughters of War is a 1930 novel by Evadne Price under the pseudonym "Helen Zenna Smith".  The semi-biographical account of an ambulance driver provides female insights to the horrors of World War I.  Not So Quiet is a critique of nationalism, masculinity in women, and the social, physical, and psychological effects of the war upon England's youth.

Price was originally asked by publisher Albert E. Marriott to compose a spoof of All Quiet on the Western Front by Erich Maria Remarque. Instead, she wrote a serious work, based on the (now lost) diaries of Winifred Young, an ambulance driver who served in France during the war.

Themes

The novel features "graphic, observable details of wounds, deformation, and death" in order to illustrate "the fragility of the human body, the sense of waste, the quality of horror" which a World War I ambulance driver would be exposed to. This graphic quality challenges gender norms related to women and violence, interrogating "assumptions about what is 'appropriate' for the woman writer."

As a response to All Quiet on the Western Front, Not So Quiet: Stepdaughters of War also draws on "an established repertoire of forms for describing the war." Remarque's novel, like Ernest Hemingway's A Farewell to Arms, continued to elicit "powerful resonances in readers" over a decade after the events of World War I; Price, like other novelists of the postwar period, used similar narrative strategies to reach the "reflective, anti-war, pro-peace readership" of "the late 1920s and early 1930s."

Legacy
In October 1930, a play based on the book premiered at the Empire Theatre on Broadway. It was directed by Chester Erskine, with Katharine Alexander playing a calloused and disillusioned ambulance driver, and Warren William a physiologically damaged officer. Although lauded by critics, who praised its "clever direction and innovative stagecraft," the production was only modestly successful, as the start of the Great Depression made audiences prefer lighter, more diverting entertainment.

Price wrote four sequels to Not So Quiet… under the Smith pseudonym between 1931 and 1934, but they were not as popular as the first, leaving the book as "a victim of its own success".

References
Citations

Further reading

1930 British novels
Anti-war novels
English novels
Novels set during World War I
Works published under a pseudonym